Lynnwood Lincoln Myers (February 23, 1914 – January 19, 2000) was a backup infielder in Major League Baseball, playing mainly at shortstop from  through  for the St. Louis Cardinals. He was born in Enola, Pennsylvania. His older brother, Billy Myers, was also a major leaguer.

In a two-season career, Myers was a .241 hitter (83-for-344) with one home run and 29 RBI in 144 games, including 42 runs, 16 doubles, three triples, and 10 stolen bases.

Myers died at the age of 85 in Harrisburg, Pennsylvania.

External links

 Retrosheet

St. Louis Cardinals players
Greensburg Trojans players
Major League Baseball shortstops
Baseball players from Pennsylvania
People from Cumberland County, Pennsylvania
1914 births
2000 deaths